The Federal Correctional Complex, Florence (FCC Florence) is a United States federal prison complex for male inmates in Colorado. It is operated by the Federal Bureau of Prisons, a division of the United States Department of Justice, and consists of four facilities:

 Federal Prison Camp, Florence (FPC Florence): a minimum-security facility.
 Federal Correctional Institution, Florence (FCI Florence): a medium-security facility.
 United States Penitentiary, Florence High (USP Florence High): a high-security facility.
 United States Penitentiary, Florence Administrative Maximum Facility (USP Florence ADMAX): a supermax facility which holds the most "dangerous" inmates in the federal prison system.

FCC Florence is located in unincorporated Fremont County, Colorado, approximately 100 miles south of Denver, Colorado.

See also

List of U.S. federal prisons
Federal Bureau of Prisons
Incarceration in the United States

References

External links
FCI Florence
USP Florence
USP Florence ADMAX

Buildings and structures in Fremont County, Colorado
Prisons in Colorado
Florence
1994 establishments in Colorado